This is a list of films produced in the Tollywood Telugu language film industry ordered by year of release in the 1990s.

Raju Donna Naatukodi

1990s



1990s
Telugu
Telugu films

te:తెలుగు సినిమాలు